George Albert Esson  (b. 30 March 1942, d. 13 July 2022) was Assistant Chief Constable of Grampian Police and Chief Constable of Dumfries and Galloway Constabulary (1989-1994). He was at the centre of major inquiries into the Piper Alpha disaster and the 1986 Chinook Helicopter Crash. He also headed the police investigation into the Lockerbie Bombing.

He is a graduate of the University of Aberdeen.

After retiring from the Police, he worked for Shell UK as a security and external affairs advisor and led their response to the Greenpeace protests at the decommissioning of the Brent Spar oil facility in the North Sea.

He was appointed CBE in the 1994 Birthday Honours.

References

 https://web.archive.org/web/20111003185235/http://www.professionalsecurity.co.uk/newsdetails.aspx?NewsArticleID=6137&imgID=1
 http://www.platform-oilandgas.com/newsdetail.lasso?section=Speaking%20Out&issue=97&issue_date=May%202007
 https://web.archive.org/web/20120316003642/http://www.abdn.ac.uk/alumni/events/month.php?month=November&year=2007

1942 births
Living people
Alumni of the University of Aberdeen
British Chief Constables
Scottish recipients of the Queen's Police Medal
Commanders of the Order of the British Empire